The Golden Palominos is the eponymously titled debut studio album by the alternative rock band The Golden Palominos. It was released on May 20, 1983, on Celluloid Records.

Critical reception
Trouser Press called the album "above-average avant-funk," writing that it "would have been a milestone if it had sounded anything like the Palominos’ New York gigs."

Track listing

Personnel 
Musicians
Michael Beinhorn – drums and Oberheim DMX on "Hot Seat", piano on "Cookout"
Anton Fier – drums, Oberheim DMX, percussion, production, mixing
Fred Frith – guitar, violin
Bill Laswell – bass guitar, production, mixing
Thi-Linh Le – vocals on "Monday Night", design, photography
Arto Lindsay – vocals, guitar, additional production
Mark E. Miller – vocals on "Hot Seat", turntables on "Hot Seat" and "Monday Night"
David Moss – percussion on "Clean Plate", "Under the Cap" and "Two Sided Fist"
Nicky Skopelitis – guitar on "Monday Night" and "I.D."
Jamaaladeen Tacuma – Steinberger bass guitar on "Clean Plate" and "Two Sided Fist"
Roger Trilling – tape on "Cookout"
John Zorn – alto saxophone, clarinet, game calls
Production and additional personnel
Martin Bisi – additional production, mixing
Peter Blegvad – vocal coach
Don Hünerberg – engineering
Mike Krowiak – additional engineering
Jan Luss – design

References

External links 
 

1983 debut albums
Albums produced by Anton Fier
Albums produced by Bill Laswell
Celluloid Records albums
The Golden Palominos albums